Anonymous works are works, such as art or literature, that have an anonymous, undisclosed, or unknown creator or author. In the case of very old works, the author's name may simply be lost over the course of history and time. There are a number of reasons anonymous works arise.

Description 
In the United States, anonymous work is legally defined as "a work on the copies or phonorecords of which no natural person is identified as author."

Explanations 
In the case of very old works, the author's name may simply be lost over the course of history and time. In such cases the author is often referred to as Anonymus, the Latin  form of "anonymous". In other cases, the creator's name is intentionally kept secret. The author's reasons may vary from fear of persecution to protection of his or her reputation. Legal reasons may also bar an author from self-identifying. An author may also wish to remain anonymous to avoid becoming famous for their work.

See also 
 Anonymous post
 List of anonymously published works
 List of works published under a pseudonym
 List of anonymous masters
 Notname

References 

 
Intellectual property law
Literature
Publishing